The Florida A&M Lady Rattlers basketball team is a NCAA Division 1 that competes in the Southwestern Athletic Conference and represents Florida A&M University in Tallahassee, Florida.

NCAA appearances
Florida A&M has appeared in the NCAA Division I women's basketball tournament twice. The Lady Rattlers have a record of 0–2.

References

External links